Trifurcula lavandulae is a moth of the family Nepticulidae. It is found in Spain and southern France.

The Moth's wingspan is 5-5.6 mm.

The larvae feed on Lavandula angustifolia and Lavandula latifolia. They mine the leaves of their host plant. The mine consists of a narrow upper-surface corridor. The larva mines in two or three leaves, migrating from one leaf to the other by way of the petiole and the rind of the stem. Pupation takes place outside of the mine.

External links
Seven New Species Of The Subgenus Glaucolepis Braun From Southern Europe (Lepidoptera: Nepticulidae, Trifurcula)
bladmineerders.nl

Nepticulidae
Moths of Europe
Moths described in 2007